Benson Glacier is in the U.S. state of Oregon. The glacier is situated in the Wallowa Mountains at an elevation generally above  on the eastern slopes Glacier Peak, a subpeak of Eagle Cap. The glacier was named in honor of Frank W. Benson, former Governor of Oregon during an expedition in 1914. Due to its small size, researchers have frequently questioned whether it was a glacier or a perennial snowfield. Areal photography taken in 2007 showed crevasses on the surface, confirming that it does flow and is a true glacier. It is not expected to remain a true glacier much longer, however, due to climate change.

Benson Glacier is the last remaining remnant of Wallowa Glacier which extended , creating the lateral moraines that created Wallowa Lake during the Last Glacial Maximum. Its ice is estimated to have been  in places. The West Fork of the Wallowa River occupies the valley it left behind.

See also
 List of glaciers in the United States

References

Glaciers of Oregon
Glaciers of Wallowa County, Oregon